George Fazio (November 12, 1912 – June 6, 1986) was an American professional golfer and a golf course architect.

Life and career
Fazio, born in Philadelphia, Pennsylvania, was a respected player in the mid-twentieth century and competed in seven Masters Tournaments from 1947 to 1954. His best finish was 14th in 1952.

Fazio won two PGA Tour events: the 1946 Canadian Open and the 1947 Bing Crosby Pro-Am (in a tie with Ed Furgol). He had career earnings of more than $50,000. He nearly won the 1950 U.S. Open at Merion Golf Club outside Philadelphia, finishing third to Ben Hogan and Lloyd Mangrum in an 18-hole playoff. This event was recently memorialized as one of the 15 most memorable Philadelphia sports moments. Like most golfers of his generation, Fazio earned his living primarily as a club pro during his regular career years. During the 1940s, he was head pro at Hillcrest Country Club in Los Angeles, where many of Hollywood's celebrities played.

After his playing days were over, Fazio went on to become a well-known golf course architect along with his nephews Tom Fazio, Jim Fazio, and course designer Lou Cappelli. The foursome built many notable courses, and they are particularly noted for the shapes built into their traps - such as clover-leaves and butterflies.

Fazio died in Jupiter, Florida at the age of 73.

Professional wins (10)

PGA Tour wins (2)
1946 Canadian Open
1947 Bing Crosby Pro-Am (tie with Ed Furgol)

Other wins (7)
this list may be incomplete
1941 Philadelphia PGA Championship
1945 California State Open
1949 Philadelphia Open Championship
1950 Middle Atlantic PGA Championship
1952 Philadelphia Open Championship
1956 Philadelphia Open Championship
1958 Philadelphia Open Championship
1959 Philadelphia Open Championship

Results in major championships

Note: Fazio never played in The Open Championship.

NT = no tournament
WD = withdrew
CUT = missed the half-way cut
R64, R32, R16, QF, SF = round in which player lost in PGA Championship match play
"T" indicates a tie for a place

Summary

Most consecutive cuts made – 14 (1941 PGA – 1951 Masters)
Longest streak of top-10s – 1 (four times)

Notable golf course designs

 PGA National Golf Club - The Haig and The Squires, Palm Beach Gardens, Florida
 Jupiter Hills - Hills & Village Courses, Tequesta, Florida
 Butler National Golf Club, Oak Brook, Illinois
 Champions Golf Club - Jackrabbit Course, Houston, Texas
 Atlantis Golf Course, Little Egg Harbor, New Jersey
 Squires Golf Club, Ambler, Pennsylvania
 Waynesborough Country Club, Paoli, Pennsylvania
 Pinehurst Resort #6
 Moss Creek Golf Club - Devil's Elbow South Course, Hilton Head Island, South Carolina
Ridgefield Golf Course, Ridgefield, Connecticut
 Cariari Golf Country Club, Costa Rica
 George Fazio Golf Course , Hilton Head Island, South Carolina
 Downingtown Country Club, Downingtown, Pennsylvania
 Hershey Country Club, Hershey, Pennsylvania
 The National Golf Club of Canada, Woodbridge, Ontario
Moselem Springs Golf Club, Fleetwood, Pennsylvania
Turtle Bay Resort, Kahuku, Hawaii (Oahu)
 Edgewood Tahoe Resort, South Lake Tahoe, Nevada
 Coronado Golf Club, Panama Rep. Panama
Cariari Country Club, Cariari, San Jose, Costa Rica
Chester Valley Golf Club, Malvern, Pennsylvania
Wollaston Golf Club, Milton, Massachusetts

References

American male golfers
PGA Tour golfers
Golf course architects
Golfers from Philadelphia
Deaths from cancer in Florida
1912 births
1986 deaths